Poland participated at the 2018 Summer Youth Olympics in Buenos Aires, Argentina from 6 October to 18 October 2018.

Medalists

Athletics

Beach volleyball

Poland qualified a girls' team based on their performance at 2017-18 European Youth Continental Cup Final.

 Girls' tournament - 1 team of 2 athletes

 Boys' tournament - 1 team of 2 athletes

Boxing

Girls

Canoeing

Poland qualified one boat based on its performance at the 2018 World Qualification Event.

 Boys' K1 - 1 boat

Cycling

Poland qualified a boys' and girls' combined team based on its ranking in the Youth Olympic Games Junior Nation Rankings.

 Boys' combined team - 1 team of 2 athletes
 Girls' combined team - 1 team of 2 athletes

Dancesport

Poland qualified one dancer based on its performance at the 2018 World Youth Breaking Championship.

 B-Boys - Axel

Field hockey

 Boys' tournament - 1 team of 9 athletes
 Girls' tournament - 1 team of 9 athletes

Boys' Tournament

Preliminary round

5–8th place semifinals

Fifth place game

Girls' Tournament

Preliminary round

Quarterfinals

Fifth to eighth place classification

Crossover

Seventh and eighth place

Fencing

Poland qualified two athletes based on its performance at the 2018 Cadet World Championship.

 Boys' Foil - Maciej Bem
 Girls' Foil - Magdalena Lawska

Modern pentathlon

Poland qualified one pentathlete based on its performance at the European Youth Olympic Games Qualifier.

 Boys' Individual - Kamil Kasperczak

Sailing

Poland qualified two boats based on its performance at the Techno 293+ European Qualifier. They later qualified one boat based on its performance at the African and European IKA Twin Tip Racing Qualifiers.

 Boys' Techno 293+ - 1 boat
 Boys' IKA Twin Tip Racing - 1 boat
 Girls' Techno 293+ - 1 boat

Shooting

Poland qualified one sport shooter based on its performance at the 2018 European Championships. 

 Girls' 10m Air Rifle - 1 quota

Individual

Team

Sport climbing

Poland qualified one sport climber based on its performance at the 2017 World Youth Sport Climbing Championships.

 Girls' combined - 1 quota (Aleksandra Kalucka)

Swimming

Table tennis

Taekwondo

Tennis

Singles

Doubles

Weightlifting

Boys

Girls

References

2018 in Polish sport
Nations at the 2018 Summer Youth Olympics
Poland at the Youth Olympics